Charles Gilbert Jr. is a writer, composer, director and educator who specializes in musical theater. Currently a Professor of Theater Arts in the Ira Brind School of Theater Arts at the University of the Arts in Philadelphia, Gilbert served as Director of the Brind School from 2008 to 2013 after heading its Musical Theater Program for nearly twenty years. He developed the SAVI System of Singing-Acting and has taught students using this pedagogy in workshops and residencies in the United Kingdom, Sweden, Denmark and Germany. Among his works for the musical stage is the 1979 musical Assassins, source of the idea for Stephen Sondheim's Tony Award-winning musical of the same name.

University of the Arts

Following a lengthy and thorough national search, Charles Gilbert was named director of the Ira Brind School of Theater Arts in 2008. Gilbert was the school's fourth director since its inception in 1984. 
Prior to that, he served as head of UArts' Musical Theater Program since its inaugural year in 1990 and nurtured its growth to a position of national and international prominence.
Gilbert retired from teaching at the University of the Arts in 2020 and currently holds the rank of Professor Emeritus.

Professional career

Gilbert wrote music and lyrics for Gemini, the Musical (libretto by Albert Innaurato, based on his play Gemini), which premiered at the Prince Music Theater in Philadelphia in 2004 and had its New York premiere at the New York Musical Theatre Festival in 2007; he received a Barrymore nomination for Outstanding Original Music for that score. He received a two other Barrymore nominations for Outstanding Musical Direction for A Year With Frog And Toad and A Funny Thing Happened on the Way To The Forum at the Arden Theater; recent music directing credits also include Randy Newman's The Middle of Nowhere at the Prince and The Fantasticks at People's Light and Theater Company.

Leading Lady, created in collaboration with playwright P. Seth Bauer, is the most recent of Gilbert's works for the musical stage; that project had a workshop production in 2013 at Drexel University in Philadelphia under the direction of Bill Fennelly. Other musicals include A Tiny Miracle, Watch The Birdie, Realities, Goosefeathers and A Is For Anything. His 1979 musical Assassins was the sources of the idea for the Stephen Sondheim/John Weidman musical of the same name, revived on Broadway in 2004 to acclaim that included seven Tony awards. Gilbert's musical revue Watch The Birdie received a production by Philly Music Theater Works at the Walnut Street Theater in Philadelphia in 2008.

Gilbert's score for My Father's Dragon (2017) is his most recent creation as Composer-in-Residence for Enchantment Theatre Company, which performs on tour at regional arts centers and schools throughout the US; previous works, including Peter Rabbit Tales, Aladdin and Other Enchanting Tales, Sylvester and the Magic Pebble and Harold and the Purple Crayon, have been enjoyed by thousands of young theater-goers in the past several years.

Gilbert's accomplishments as a stage director include the 2005 revival of Anyone Can Whistle at the Prince Music Theater, starring Chuck Wagner and Jane Summerhays, and two productions at the International Festival of Musical Theater in Cardiff, Wales: A Lyrical Opera Made By Two (Gertrude Stein and William Turner’s cubist lesbian romance) and Songs for a New World. He was Musical Theater Coordinator for the Kevin Smith/Miramax film Jersey Girl, and appears in the film as Sweeney Todd. He has also directed for Opera Delaware and the National Music Theater Network.

He is currently Treasurer and Past President of the Musical Theater Educators Alliance, an organization of which he is a founding member.

Gilbert received his MFA in Directing from Carnegie-Mellon University in 1977 and his BA as a "Dean's Scholar" in Musical Theater from the University of Delaware in 1975.

References

External links
Official site
University of the Arts

Living people
Year of birth missing (living people)
Place of birth missing (living people)
American musical theatre composers